The , or JLPT, is a standardized criterion-referenced test to evaluate and certify Japanese language proficiency for non-native speakers, covering language knowledge, reading ability, and listening ability. The test is held twice a year in Japan and selected countries (on the first Sunday of July and December), and once a year in other regions (either on the first Sunday of December or July depending on region). The JLPT is conducted by the Japan Foundation for tests overseas (with cooperation of local host institutions), and Japan Educational Exchanges and Services for tests in Japan.

The JLPT consists of five levels. Until 2009, the test had four levels, with 4 being the lowest and 1 being the highest level of certification. JLPT certificates do not expire or become invalid over time.

History
The JLPT was first held in 1984 in response to the growing demand for standardized Japanese language certification. Initially 7,000 people took the test. Until 2003, the JLPT was one of the requirements for foreigners entering Japanese universities. Since 2003, the Examination for Japanese University Admission for International Students (EJU) is used by most universities for this purpose; unlike the JLPT, which is solely a multiple-choice exam, the EJU contains sections which require the examinee to write in Japanese.

Statistics
In 2004, the JLPT was offered in 40 countries, including Japan. Of the 302,198 examinees in that year, 47% (around 140,000) were certified for their respective levels. The number of candidates continued to rise to 559,056 in 2008, while the percentage of candidates certified has fallen below 36%. In 2009, when a revised system was introduced in which two exams are held each year in East Asia, a total of 768,114 people took the exam.  In 2010, 610,000 people took the test. In 2019, 1,168,535 people took the test.

By country
Top 10 countries with the most test takers:

By city
Top 10 cities with the most test takers:

Acceptance in Japan
 Test takers who pass JLPT N1 receive 15 points, and those who pass JLPT N2 receive 10 points under the government's "Point-based Preferential Immigration Treatment System for Highly Skilled Foreign Professionals." Individuals with a total of 70 points or higher receive preferential treatment at immigration.
 N1 is a prerequisite for foreign medical professionals who wish to take examinations to be licensed in Japan, and for certain foreign nationals who wish to attend nursing school in Japan.
 Those who have passed either N1 or N2 (regardless of citizenship) are exempt from the Japanese language section of the middle school equivalency examination, which is required to enter a Japanese high school if the applicant did not graduate from a Japanese middle school.
 N1 is sometimes accepted instead of the Examination for Japanese University Admission for foreign students who wish to study at Japanese universities.
 One of the requirements for the nurse/caregiver candidates under the EPA. Under the Economic Partnership Agreement (EPA) with Indonesia, the Philippines, and Vietnam, a JLPT certificate is required for Indonesian, Filipino (approximately Level N5 or higher), and Vietnamese (Level N3 or higher) nurse or caregiver candidates who visit Japan.

Administration

In Japan, the JLPT is administered by the Ministry of Education, Culture, Sports, Science, and Technology (MEXT) through the Japan Educational Exchanges and Services (JEES). Overseas, the Japan Foundation co-proctors test administration with local cultural exchange and/or educational institutions, or with committees specially established for this purpose.

Test format
The revised test pattern was implemented in 2010. The test consists of five levels: N1, N2, N3, N4, and N5, with N1 being the highest level and N5 the lowest. No Test Content Specification is published as it is discouraged to study from kanji and vocabulary lists.

Scoring
Passing is based on scaled scores calculated using item-response theory. Raw scores are not directly used to determine conditions for passing, nor are they reported, except in rough form in the "Reference Information" section. Raw scores are converted to a standard scale, so that equivalent performance on tests from different years and different levels of difficulty yields the same scaled score. The scaled scores are reported, broken down by section, and these are the scores used to determine passing.

In addition, a "Reference Information" section is provided on the report card; this is purely informational – for the examinee's future studies – and is not used in determining if an examinee has passed. The grade given is based on the raw score, and is either A, B, or C, accordingly as the raw score was 67% or above, between 34% and 66%, or below 34%. This reference information is given for vocabulary, grammar, and reading on the N4 and N5, and for vocabulary and grammar (but not reading) on the N1, N2, and N3. In both cases, this breaks down the score on the "Language Knowledge" section into separate skills, but in neither case is performance on the listening section analyzed.

Pass marks
Passing the test requires both achieving an overall pass mark for the total points, and passing each section individually; these are based on the scaled scores. The sectional scores are to ensure that skills are not unbalanced – so one cannot pass by doing well in the reading section but poorly in the listening section, for instance. The overall pass mark depends on the level and varies between 100/180 (55.55%) for the N1 and 80/180 (44.44%) for the N5. The pass marks for individual sections are all 19/60 = 31.67% – equivalently, 38/120 = 19/60 for the large section on the N4 and N5. Note that the sectional pass levels are below the overall pass level, at 31.67% instead of 44.44%–55.55%: one need not achieve the overall pass level on each section. These standards were adopted starting in July 2010, and do not vary from year to year, with the scaling instead varying.

Test sections

 Note: "Vocabulary" includes kanji and vocabulary (previous 文字・語彙)

Estimated study time

Study hour comparison data for students residing in Japan, published by the Japanese Language Education Center:

Comparison with Common European Framework of Reference for Languages
Although the Japan Foundation has not given any official table of comparison between the CEFR and the JLPT, several Japanese language textbooks and language courses at the university level, based on the competencies required for each level, tend to use the following table of comparison.

Older edition

Applications and results

The application period is usually around early March until late April for July's examination and around early August until late September for December's exam.

Results for the December test are announced the following February for examinees in Japan, and March for overseas candidates. Test results are sent to the examinees through the testing organization or center to which they applied. From 2012, with online registration, results are available online before they are mailed out (late August for the July test). All examinees receive a report indicating their scores by section. Those who pass also receive a Certificate of Proficiency.

Previous format (1984–2009)

Until 2009, the test had four levels. JLPT certificates do not expire, so results from the previous format remain valid.

All instructions on the test were written in Japanese, although their difficulty is adjusted to remain appropriate to each test level. This specification served as a reference for examiners to compile test questions, rather than as a study guide for candidates. It consisted of kanji lists, expression lists, vocabulary lists, and grammar lists for all four JLPT levels. However, about 20% of the kanji, vocabulary, and grammar in any one exam may have been drawn from outside the prescribed lists at the discretion of exam compilers.

Numbers in parentheses indicate the exact number in the Test Content Specification.

The independent source the Japanese Language Education Center publishes the following study hour comparison data:

Test sections
In its previous format, the JLPT was divided into three sections: "Characters and Vocabulary" (100 points), "Listening Comprehension" (100 points), and "Reading Comprehension and Grammar" (200 points).

The first section (文字･語彙, moji, goi) tests knowledge of vocabulary and various aspects of the Japanese writing system. This includes identifying the correct kanji characters for given situations, selecting the correct hiragana readings for given kanji, choosing the appropriate terms for given sentences, and choosing the appropriate usage of given words.

The second section (聴解, chōkai) comprises two sub-sections that test listening comprehension. The first involves choosing the picture which best represents the situation presented by a prerecorded conversation. The second is of a similar format but presents no visual clues.

Section three (読解･文法, dokkai, bunpō) uses authentic or semi-authentic reading passages of various lengths to test reading comprehension. Questions include prompts to fill in blank parts of the text and requests to paraphrase key points. Grammar questions request that examinees select the correct grammar structure to convey a given point or test conjugations and postpositional particle agreement.

Comparison with new format

Two changes in levels of tests were made from the previous four-level format: firstly, a new level was inserted between the old level 3 and level 2, and secondly, the content of the top level exam (old level 1) was changed to test slightly more advanced skills, though the passing level was not changed, possibly through equating of test scores. Vocabulary in particular is said to be taken from an increased pool of 18,000 words.

The addition of the new N3 was done to address the problem of the difficulty gap between levels 3 and 2: in the past, there had been requests for revisions to address the fact that examinees who had passed the Level 3 test often had trouble with passing the Level 2 test because of the large gap in the level of skill needed to pass those two levels. There was also a desire to measure abilities more advanced than those targeted by the current Level 1 test, hence the top-level exam was modified.

The correspondence is as follows:
 N1: slightly more advanced than the original level 1, but the same passing level
 N2: the same as the original level 2
 N3: in between the original level 2 and level 3
 N4: the same as the original level 3
 N5: the same as the original level 4

The revised test continues to test the same content categories as the original, but the first and third sections of the test have been combined into a single section. Sections on oral and writing skills were not introduced. Further, a requirement to pass individual sections was added, rather than only achieving an overall score.

It has been argued that changes to the exam were connected to the introduction of new language policies instituted by the Ministry of Education regarding the education of minorities in Japan.

See also
 Business Japanese Proficiency Test
 Test of Chinese as a Foreign Language (TOCFL)
 Mandarin Proficiency Test (HSK)
 ILR scale
 J-Test
 Kanji kentei
 Test of Proficiency in Korean
 List of language proficiency tests

References

External links

 日本語能力試験 JLPT , the official JLPT website
 The Japanese-Language Proficiency Test, the official English-language website by JEES and the Japan Foundation

Japanese language tests
Testing and exams in Japan